Union House Hotel is located in De Pere, Wisconsin. It was added to the National Register of Historic Places in 2003.

History
The hotel was originally run by brothers Nicholas and Fred Altmayer. In 1918, August Maternoski purchased the building. Additions have been made to the hotel in 1885, 1903, 1918 and 1922. It the oldest continuously operated hotel in the area.

References

Hotel buildings on the National Register of Historic Places in Wisconsin
Hotels in Wisconsin
Hotel buildings completed in 1883
Hotels established in 1883
Buildings and structures in Brown County, Wisconsin
National Register of Historic Places in Brown County, Wisconsin
De Pere, Wisconsin